Hadi Soesastro  (Born Tan Yueh Ming April 30, 1945 – May 4, 2010, widely known as Hadi or "Mingkie") was an Indonesian economist, academic and public intellectual.  Hadi was one of the founders of the Centre for Strategic and International Studies (CSIS), a think tank founded in 1971, where he served as an executive director and economist. The Jakarta Post referred to Soesastro as "one of Indonesia’s foremost economists."

Soesastro was born in the city of Malang, East Java, Indonesia.

Soesastro graduated with an aeronautical engineering degree from the Technische Hochschule in Aachen, Germany. Aside from his studies, Hadi was active in the Indonesian students association, becoming chairman of the West German branch.

Soesastro obtained his doctorate from the Frederick S. Pardee RAND Graduate School in Santa Monica, California.

He worked as an economist at the CSIS, which he helped to found. He worked as an advisor to both the World Bank and the Asian Development Bank. From December 1999 until September 2000, Soesastro served as an economic advisor to Indonesian President Abdurrahman Wahid as a member of the president's National Economic Council.

Within the academic field, Soesastro was an adjunct professor at Columbia University in New York City. and Australian National University's Research School of Pacific and Asian Studies (RSPAS) and maintained close links with the activities of the Indonesia project in the RSPAS.

In April 2013, The Australian government announced the Hadi Soesastro Prize, awarded annually to two Australia Awards Scholarship recipients from Indonesia undertaking doctorates in Australia. An entitlement of up to $25,000 will be awarded to Australia Awards Hadi Soesastro Prize scholars for further study, field work, conference attendance, and research or community projects. 

Soesastro was board member of the Asia Society in New York and founding member of the Pacific Economic Cooperation Council

References

Further reading

 Hal Hill and Mari Pangestu. 2010. 'M. Hadi Soesastro: Indonesian public intellectual, Asia Pacific visionary', Bulletin of Indonesian Economic Studies, Vol 46, No 2, pp. 171–9.
 Howard Dick. 2013. Book review of Mochamad Pasha (ed.), 2011, Hadi Soesastro: Sebuah Antologi Pemikirian [Hadi Soesastro: An Anthology of Thoughts], Centre for Strategic and International Studies, Jakarta, in Bulletin of Indonesian Economics Studies, Vol 49, No 1, April 2013, pp. 119–125.

1945 births
2010 deaths
People from Malang
Indonesian economists
Indonesian academics
Indonesian Roman Catholics
Indonesian people of Chinese descent
Columbia University faculty
Academic staff of the Australian National University